France AEROTECH is the name of the French national network for aeronautical and space grandes écoles (engineering graduate schools).

It has been created in 2011 by Arts et Métiers ParisTech, École centrale de Lyon, École centrale de Nantes, École nationale de l'aviation civile and École nationale supérieure d’électronique, informatique, télécommunications, mathématique et mécanique de Bordeaux.

The goals of France AEROTECH are to provide French courses abroad, developing international research projects and courses in aeronautical and space engineering, and helping emerging markets. 

To achieve all these projects, the universities will created a summer program in embedded systems and a master in airworthiness.

References 

Aviation schools
Aerospace engineering organizations
Aviation schools in France
Grandes écoles
Organizations established in 2011
École nationale de l'aviation civile